Mishina Gora is an impact crater in European Russia, 180 kilometres southwest of St. Petersburg. It is located in Pskov Oblast of the Northwestern Federal District.

The crater is exposed at the surface, but is not easily distinguishable from overhead imagery.

References

Further reading 
 Shmayenok, A. I., Malakhovskiy, F. B., Explosion pipe near the southeast shore of Lake Chud' (in Russian). Vestnik Leningrad University, v. 24, pp. 97-107. 1974
 Shmayenok, A. I., Tikhomirov, S. V., The Mishina Gora cryptoexplosion structure near Lake Chudskoye (Peipus) (in Russian). Doklady Akademii Nauk SSSR, v. 219, pp. 701–703. 1974

Impact craters of Russia
Carboniferous impact craters
Permian impact craters
Paleozoic Russia
Permian Russia
Landforms of Pskov Oblast